Jerzy Żyszkiewicz (17 January 1950; Oleśnica – 12 July 2014; Wrocław) was a Polish politician. He was elected to Sejm on 25 September 2005, getting 10527 votes in 3 Wrocław district as a candidate from Samoobrona Rzeczpospolitej Polskiej list.

See also
Members of Polish Sejm 2005-2007

References

External links
Jerzy Żyszkiewicz - parliamentary page - includes declarations of interest, voting record, and transcripts of speeches.

1950 births
2014 deaths
People from Oleśnica
Members of the Polish Sejm 2005–2007
Self-Defence of the Republic of Poland politicians